Krystyna Stypułkowska-Smith (18 August 1938 – 20 October 2020) was a Polish actress, translator and . She is best known for her performances as Pelagia in Innocent Sorcerers and as Kati Klee in Trace of Stones.

Biography
With a background in Romance studies she worked as a translator in Poland. She was interested in working with Andrzej Wajda and got a lead role in the 1960 film Innocent Sorcerers. Director Frank Beyer liked her performance and she got the role of Kati Klee in the 1966 East German film Trace of Stones. In 1968 she moved to the United States and trained diplomats at the United States Department of State.

References

External links 

1938 births
2020 deaths
Polish film actresses